Bollywood Calling is a 2001 Indian English-language comedy drama film written and directed by Nagesh Kukunoor. The film stars Pat Cusick, Navin Nischol, Om Puri, and Perizaad Zorabian.

The film showcases the satirical nuances of Bollywood. It was screened at the Rome Film Festival, and the MAMI Film Festival.

Cast
Pat Cusick as Patrick Stormaire
Navin Nischol as Manu Kapoor 
Om Puri as Subramaniam
Perizaad Zorabian as Kajal 
Monique Curnen as Karen
Chet Dixon as Abe
Elahe Hiptoola as Reporter
Nagesh Kukunoor as Gullu
Mira Nair as Mira

References

2001 films
English-language Indian films
Actors
Films about actors
Films about filmmaking
Films about theatre
Actors
2001 comedy-drama films
Indian comedy-drama films
Indian satirical films
Films set in the United States
Films set in India
Films directed by Nagesh Kukunoor
2000s satirical films
2000s Hindi-language films
20th Century Fox films
2000s English-language films